Shin Hyun-hwak (October 29, 1920 – April 26, 2007) was Prime Minister of South Korea from December 13, 1979 to May 21, 1980, representing the Democratic Republican Party.

Early life and career 
Shin was born in Chilgok-gun, North Gyeongsang Province on October 29, 1920. He studied at Daegu High School and graduated in law from Gyeongseong Imperial University in 1943, entering a career as a public official under Japanese rule. Following the establishment of the First Republic of Korea, Shin entered the Ministry of Commerce and Industry in 1951. He was elected part of the legislature of South Korea in 1973, in the Democratic Republican Party.

Government 
Shin was the South Korean Minister of Health and Social Affairs between 1975 and 1978, becoming Deputy Prime Minister of South Korea in 1978. While Deputy Prime Minister, he was also minister for the economic planning board. Following the assassination of Park Chung-hee, Prime Minister Choi Kyu-hah became acting President of South Korea. On December 13, 1979, Shin was appointed as Prime Minister of South Korea, as part of the Coup d'état of December Twelfth. Following the coup, Choi Kyu-hah repealed a decree banning criticism of the constitution, as well as releasing dissidents from prison. Following the Coup d'état of May Seventeenth, Shin was deposed on May 21, 1980, in the events that led to the dissolution of the Fourth Republic of Korea and creation of the Fifth Republic of Korea.

Later life 
Shin remained on the National Advisory Council from 1981 to 1988. In 1986, he gained a position at Samsung C&T Corporation, becoming chairman in 1987. He died on April 26, 2007, at Seoul National University Hospital, after having been in the hospital since February 2006 due to a backbone fracture.

References 

1920 births
2007 deaths
People from North Gyeongsang Province
Seoul National University alumni
Prime Ministers of South Korea
Sin clan of Pyongsan